Ebrahimabad (also Romanized as Ebrāhīmābād and Ibrāhīmābād; also known as Ebrahim Abad Mo’men Abad) is a village in Mud Rural District, Mud District, Sarbisheh County, South Khorasan Province, Iran. At the 2006 census, its population was 114, in 33 families.

References 

Populated places in Sarbisheh County